The Kerry Camino is a walk modelled on the Camino de Santiago in Northern Spain. The route comprises a section of the Dingle Way between Tralee and Dingle which has some of the most dramatic scenery and coastline in Ireland. The route purportedly follows a path taken by Saint Brendan, at present the route begins at the St. Johns Roman Catholic Church in Tralee and ends at St. James Church of Ireland in Dingle.

External links 
 Kerry Camino - Official Website
 Dingle Way Website

Historic trails and roads in Ireland
Pilgrimage routes
Transport in County Kerry